Derlis Javier Florentín Noguera (9 January 1984 – 28 March 2010) was a Paraguayan football striker.

Career
Florentín started his career with Humaitá.

International career
He was part of the U17 and U20 Paraguay national football teams that won the Milk Cup competition in 2001 and 2003.

Club statistics

Death
Florentín died in a car accident at midnight when his car crashed into another on Cordillera Highway, 54 kilometers away from Asunción. He was taken to a nearby hospital, but died shortly after. His companion, Aléxis Afonso, also died in the accident.

Titles
 Milk Cup: 2001, 2003 (with Paraguay)

References

External links

1984 births
2010 deaths
People from Caacupé
Paraguayan footballers
Club Alianza Lima footballers
Barcelona S.C. footballers
Club Nacional de Football players
Hokkaido Consadole Sapporo players
Danubio F.C. players
Atenas de San Carlos players
Expatriate footballers in Argentina
Expatriate footballers in Brazil
Expatriate footballers in Ecuador
Expatriate footballers in Japan
Expatriate footballers in Peru
Expatriate footballers in Uruguay
Club de Gimnasia y Esgrima La Plata footballers
J2 League players
Mito HollyHock players
Paraguayan expatriate footballers
Road incident deaths in Paraguay
Sociedade Esportiva Palmeiras players
Sportivo Luqueño players
Association football forwards